The Philipsburg Proclamation is a historical document issued by British Army General Sir Henry Clinton on 30 June 1779, intended to encourage slaves to run away and enlist in the Royal Forces.

Text
General Clinton issued the following proclamation:
Whereas the enemy have adopted a practice of enrolling NEGROES among their Troops, I do hereby give notice That all NEGROES taken in arms, or upon any military Duty, shall be purchased for the public service at a stated Price; the money to be paid to the Captors.
But I do most strictly forbid any Person to sell or claim Right over any NEGROE, the property of a Rebel, who may take Refuge with any part of this Army: And I do promise to every NEGROE who shall desert the Rebel Standard, full security to follow within these Lines, any Occupation which he shall think proper.
Given under my Hand, at Head Quarters, PHILIPSBURGH the 30th day of June, 1779.
H CLINTON

Background
The proclamation extended the scope of Dunmore's Proclamation, issued four years earlier by Virginia's last Royal governor, Lord Dunmore, granting freedom to slaves in Virginia willing to serve the Royal forces. The new document, issued from Clinton's temporary headquarters at the Philipsburg Manor House in Westchester County, New York, proclaimed all slaves in the newly established United States belonging to American Patriots free, regardless of their willingness to fight for the British Crown. It further promised protection, freedom and land to any slaves who left their masters. 

The move was one of desperation on the part of the British, who realized that the Revolution was not going in their favor. In a way it was too successful: so many slaves escaped (over 5,000 from Georgia alone), that Clinton ordered many to return to their masters. The Treaty of Paris of 1783 provided that all property including slaves would be returned to their rebel masters. However, British commanders refused, and compensation was paid instead.  About 3,000 former slaves were relocated to Nova Scotia, where they were known as Black Loyalists. Many continued on to Sierra Leone, where they established Freetown, its capital.

See also
Black Loyalist
Nova Scotian settlers (Sierra Leone)

References

American Revolution
United States documents
Government documents
Slavery in the United States
Military history of the Thirteen Colonies
1779
1779 in international relations
Proclamations
Military emancipation in the American Revolutionary War